The MEKO 360 is a class of five ships built in Germany for the Argentine and Nigerian navies. The MEKO 360 was the first version of the MEKO family of vessels built by Blohm und Voss. The type comes in two variants, the MEKO 360H1, comprising one ship, and the MEKO 360H2, comprising four ships. The alternatively classed as frigates and destroyers by different sources. The design is based on the modular concept which allows swapping out different armaments to fit mission requirements and allows easier application of upgrades and refits.

Variants

MEKO 360H1

A single vessel of the MEKO 360H1 variant was produced for the Nigerian Navy. Called , it is one of the largest vessels of that navy.

MEKO 360H2

Six vessels were ordered and four vessels of a second variant, MEKO 360H2, were constructed for Argentina. They are considered frigates and destroyers by different publications. The design is based on the concept of modular systems and is capable of changing the armament of the ship swiftly and can be modernized/refitted with more ease.

The ships have a maximum speed of  while using their Olympus gas turbines at  using their Tyne turbines.

The Argentinian vessels are armed with eight Exocet surface-to-surface missiles in two quad launchers mounted centrally and one octuple launcher for Aspide surface-to-air missiles mounted aft of the superstructure. The MEKO 360H2 are also equipped with one OTO Melara /54 calibre naval gun forward of the superstructure, eight Bofors 40 mm/70 calibre guns, and two triple-mounted  ILAS torpedo tubes.

Ships

See also
 
  
  
 MEKO 140
 MEKO 200 
  
  
  
  
 Second Generation Patrol Vessel

Notes

Bibliography 
 
 

Meko 360-class frigates
Destroyer classes
Frigate classes